The Windgather Rocks ( a.s.l.) is a gritstone crag on the Derbyshire–Cheshire border in England. It is in the Peak District National Park and is a popular site for learning the rudiments of rock climbing. As the name suggests the area is exposed to the prevailing westerly winds. The rocks lie above Taxal Edge and are part of a north–south ridge that starts between Kettleshulme and Whaley Bridge and culminates at Shining Tor. The crag was featured in the first guide to rock climbing in the Peak District, Some Gritstone Climbs, published in 1913 and written by John Laycock.

References

External links

UK Climbing database
High-res photos of Windgather Rocks
A walk including the Windgather Rocks
 

Tourist attractions in Derbyshire
Tourist attractions in Cheshire
Hills of Cheshire
Mountains and hills of the Peak District
Climbing areas of England